The Kinzig Pass or Chinzig Pass or Chinzig Chulm (German: Kinzigpass) is a high mountain pass in the Schwyz Alps of Central Switzerland. During the War of the Second Coalition, the Allied army of Alexander Suvorov marched across the pass.

Geography
The Kinzig Pass is traversed by a trail connecting the Schächental in the Canton of Uri and the Muota Valley in the Canton of Schwyz. Starting from the south side of the range, the trail starts near Bürglen and Spiringen and crosses the pass to the village of Muotathal on the north side. The top of the pass is southeast of the Rossstock, elevation , and south of the Chaiserstock, elevation .

History
The Allied army commanded by Russian Field Marshal Suvorov crossed the pass from south to north on 27–28 September 1799. The westernmost column of soldiers started their climb a short distance east of Bürglen while the easternmost column, including Suvorov, started from Spiringen. The Allied army included about 20,000 Russians and 2,000 Austrians.

See also
 List of mountain passes in Switzerland

Notes

References

External links

Mountain passes of Switzerland
Mountain passes of the Alps
Mountain passes of the canton of Uri